Tettigomyiinae is a subfamily of cicadas in the family Cicadidae, found in tropical Africa. There are about 16 genera and at least 100 described species in Tettigomyiinae.

The tribes Tettigomyiini and Ydiellini were recently transferred to this subfamily from Cicadettinae.

Genera
These 16 genera belong to the subfamily Tettigomyiinae:

 Bavea Distant, 1905
 Gazuma Distant, 1905
 Lacetas Karsch, 1890
 Ligymolpa Karsch, 1890
 Malagasia Distant, 1882
 Malgachialna Boulard, 1980
 Maroboduus Distant, 1920
 Nablistes Karsch, 1891
 Nyara Villet, 1999
 Paectira Karsch, 1890
 Quintilia Stål, 1866
 Spoerryana Boulard, 1974
 Stagea Villet, 1995
 Stagira Stål, 1862
 Tettigomyia Amyot & Serville, 1843
 Xosopsaltria Kirkaldy, 1904

References

Further reading
 
 
 

 
Cicadidae